An optical turnstile is a physical security device designed to restrict or control access to a building or secure area. Optical turnstiles are usually a part of an access control system, which also consists of software, card readers, and controllers. Optical turnstiles operate much like regular mechanical turnstiles, except that they rely primarily on electronic (infrared) beams, and audible/visual interfaces to control entry. Rather than physically restraining a person, the optical turnstile uses sounds and lights to alert others to attempted entry by unauthorized individuals. The advent of the Americans with Disabilities Act (ADA) drove optical turnstile development because physical barriers for access were no longer legal for public access due to the fact that persons in wheelchairs or with other disabilities could not use them as access points.   For this reason, they are not likely to be used in subways and stadiums, as they are suited for settings where design and aesthetics are deemed important, such as lobbies. They are perfect for high rise buildings with a single path through the lobby and staffed reception. The rate of people passing through the optical turnstile is high, with less delay than other methods. They are also suitable for the handicapped, as they are barrier-free.

Early optical turnstiles used centralized programmable logic controllers i.e. a single processor for each installation location.  Later individual controllers, one per lane, were employed.

Some of the first North American optical turnstiles were developed in the late 1980s for the San Francisco market by Omega Corporate Security of Walnut Creek, California. Early installations included Charles Schwab, East Bay Municipal Utility District, and Wells Fargo.  In parallel, Automatic Systems and others developed barrier type optical turnstiles (speedgates) for the mass transit industry that were eventually adapted and evolved for Class A commercial real estate and corporate HQ entrance control markets. Today there are many manufacturers, based in North America, Europe, China and around the world.

The optical turnstile products have evolved with technological advances  over time. Many security entrance lanes today are optical turnstile portals employing moving, mobile barriers of metal, glass or acrylic in some cases. The barriers can be drop arms, swinging glass, retractable (sliding) glass, or other materials. The sensing technology has improved to a higher level of security violation detection, as well as to allow for faster throughput. Longer cabinets are sometimes used to increase throughput. Trolley detection is employed to discern between tailgate/piggybackers and roller bags and luggage. Many security optical turnstiles are IP network ready, and certified for mechanical and electrical safety via UL325 or UL2593 standards by nationally recognized testing labs.

Newest technological offerings in optical turnstiles include climb over detection software, biometrics and QR code reader integrations inside the cabinet, and built-in elevator destination dispatch screens often at 45 degree angle. Manufacturers can state their product reliability in terms of MCBF (Mean Cycles Between Failure) or in terms of warranties - usually between 1 and 5 years.

Following the global COVID-19 crisis, new hygiene oriented credentialing integrations became the focus for pedestrian entrance control manufacturers. Card readers and even some (fingerprint) biometric devices that require contact are expected to be largely replaced by contactless facial recognition, temperature scanning, palm geometery, iris scan, and advanced handwave readers. Smartphone credentials that use wifi, cellular, and bluetooth technology are gaining interest for this purpose as well. Besides the obvious hygiene benefits of such new credentialing, security is also enhanced in the biometric case by the inability for biometrics to be stolen or shared between individuals. 

Interest in turnkey, installed speed gate/speedlane optical turnstile systems rose after 2020 due to concerns with lack of technical trained resources after the Pandemic and a general interest for integrators to focus on parts and smarts rather than labor. Providers of security entrance control systems such as turnstiles, portals and security revolving doors are being counted on for full install and service support as well.

See also
 Access control
 ID Card
 Physical security
 Security
 Stile
 Turnstile

References

3. McGovern, Mike "Designing an Effective Pedestrian Entrance Control System", American Security Today, 2019 

Security
Types of gates